Dimitri Tikovoï is a French, Grammy-nominated record producer and DJ who has worked with bands including Placebo, Purple Disco Machine, Ghost, The Horrors, Charli XCX, Black Honey, Mikky Ekko, Marianne Faithfull, Becky Hill, Blondie and Nicola Roberts. In 2002, Tikovoi released an album under the name "Trash Palace" (Positions, featuring Brian Molko, John Cale, Marc Almond, Asia Argento and others).

Career
Early in his U.K career, Tikovoï worked on some Placebo remixes and Placebo's cover of Kate Bush's "Running Up That Hill", and then produced their fifth album Meds, which went on to sell over a million copies worldwide. He has since worked with The Horrors, Charli XCX, Ed Harcourt, Nicola Roberts, Marianne Faithfull, Mnek, Champs, Paloma Faith and numerous UK based acts.

Tikovoï has also written for movies including the award-winning (Sundance 2008) movie by Samuel Benchetrit J'ai toujours rêvé d'être un gangster and the Kevin McDonald movie State of Play.

In 2012, Tikovoï was nominated for the MPG International Producer of the Year award.

Recently Tikovoï has produced and written songs for Purple Disco Machine who scored #1 of the Airplay charts in Europe, Black Honey #1 of the independent official U.K charts, Becky Hill, Blondie and Ghost who charted at #1 in the Billboard 200 charts and went top 10 in 15 countries.

Albums worked on by Dimitri Tikovoï

 In The Dark - Purple Disco Machine feat Sophie & The Giants - 2022
 Written & Directed - Black Honey - 2021
 My Life, My Canvas - Frank's White Canvas - 2020
 Girls Like Us - Twice - 2019
 Life In Colour - Andreya Triana - 2019
 Prequelle - Ghost - 2018
 Pollinator - Blondie - 2017
 Rude Love - Becky Hill - 2017
 Forgotten Pleasures - Findlay - 2017
 Eureka - Leslie Clio - 2015
 Vamala - Champs- 2015
 Give My Love to London - Marianne Faithfull - 2014
 Little Armageddon - Skip The Use 
 Only Child - DedRekoning Featuring Sophie Ellis-Bextor - 2014
 True Romance - Charli XCX - 2013
 Never Forget - Bebe Black
 Kids - Mikky Ekko - 2013
 Death Wish - Bebe Black
 Is This Love - Maya von Doll - 2012
 Cinderella's Eyes - Nicola Roberts - 2011
 "If The Truth Be Told" - MNEK
 My Way - Ian Brown - 2009
 Mirror Mirror - The Irrepressibles - 2010
 Make a Scene - Sophie Ellis-Bextor - 2011
 Mirror/Mirror - Ghinzu - 2009
 Dance On The Beast - Sharko - 2009
 State Of Play soundtrack for the Kevin Macdonald movie - 2009
 Battle For The Sun - Placebo - 2009
 See The Light - The Hours - 2009
 Strange House - The Horrors - 2007
 Extended Play 07 - Placebo 
 Beautiful Lie - Ed Harcourt 
 Never Before - The Ghost Frequency 
 Actor/Actress - Fear Of Music 
 Communiqueur d'Amour Re-Mix - Les Ritas Mitsouko
 I Always Wanted to Be a Gangster soundtrack for the Samuel Benchetrit movie 
 Nothing Means Everything - The Dykeenies 
 Proud Sponsors Of Boredom - Kill The Young
 Meds - Placebo 
 The Horrors - The Horrors 
 We Are Not The Enemy - Fear of Music 
 Soulève-Moi - Elli Medeiros 
 A l'Ouest - Pravda 
 New Ideas - The Dykeenies 
 Trip the Light Fantastic - Sophie Ellis-Bextor 
 Monsieur Gainsbourg Revisited - Serge Gainsbourg 
 That Great Love Sound - The Raveonettes 
 The Servant - The Servant 
 La Folie Douce - Elista 
 Kill The Young - Kill The Young
 "Sane" - Archive 
 Sing It Out - Hope of the States
 Molecule - Sharko 
 Running Up that Hill - Placebo 
 English Summer Rain - Single - Placebo 
 Twist Re-Mix - Goldfrapp 
 5 Tracks E.P - John Cale 
 Positions - Trash Palace 
 Hybrid - Gary Numan 
 Ill Gotten Gains - Michael J. Sheehy 
 Sweet Blue Gene - Michael J. Sheehy
 Presque rien - Stefie Shock 
 Black Market Music - Placebo 
 Stranger Blues - Dream City Film Club

References

Living people
Musicians from Paris
French DJs
French record producers
French songwriters
Male songwriters
Year of birth missing (living people)